Magiya Hala (Chinese: 馬佳氏) was one of the Manchu Great Eight Clans. Originated from Giyaliku Magiya area, named by the place.

After the demise of the dynasty, some of its descendants sinicized their clan name to the Chinese surnames Ma (馬) or Jin (金).

Notable figures

Males

 Tuhai (图海), a grand tutor of crown prince, a grand secretary of Zhonghe hall and first class Zhongda duke (一等忠达公), later enshrined in Imperial Ancestral Temple under the name Wenxiang (文襄)
 Nuomin (诺敏), a Minister of Rites
 Ma'ersai (马尔塞)
 
 Gaishan (盖山), an examiner (员外郎，pinyin:yuanwailang)
 Santai (三台)
 Santian (三忝)
Hengguang (恒广)
 Shengjin (昇寅)
 Baoxun (宝询), a supervisor of the Manor of Charitable Heaven (奉天府尹) and General Shengjing (盛京将军)
 Baolin, a supervisor of the Manor of Stable Knowledge (定知府)
 Shaoying (绍英), a Minister of Revenue in 1911
 Shijie (世杰) & Shiliang (世良)
 Prince Consort

Females
Imperial Consort
 Consort
 Consort Rong (d. 1727), the Kangxi Emperor's consort, the mother of Chengrui (1667–1670), Saiyinchahun (1672–1674), Princess Rongxian (1673–1728), Changhua (1674), Changsheng (1675–1677) and Yunzhi (1677–1732)

Princess Consort
 Concubine
 Yunki's concubine, the mother of Princess (1699–1743), Lady (1703–1724) and Lady (1705–1784)

See also
List of Manchu clans

References

Manchu clans
Qing dynasty people

Plain Yellow Banner